Corsi is a surname. Notable people with the name include:

 Adolfo Corsi (fl. 1928), Italian cyclist
 Angelo Corsi (born 1989), Italian footballer 
 Cristiana Corsi (1976–2016), Italian taekwondo practitioner
 Ermanno Corsi (born 1939), Italian journalist and writer
 Domenico Maria Corsi (1633–1697), Italian Cardinal
 Giuseppe Corsi da Celano (1631/32–after 1691), better known as Celani, Italian composer of the Baroque era
 Jacopo Corsi (1561–1602), Italian composer
 Jamie Corsi (born 1987), Welsh rugby union player
 Jerome Corsi (born 1946), American author, political commentator and conspiracy theorist
 Jim Corsi (disambiguation), multiple people, including:
Jim Corsi (baseball) (1961–2022), American baseball pitcher
Jim Corsi (ice hockey) (born 1954), Canadian ice hockey goaltender and coach
 Joe Corsi (1894–1959), rugby league footballer of the 1920s for Wales, and Oldham
 Marco Corsi, American engineer
 Renato Corsi (born 1963), American-Argentine football (soccer) player
 Simone Corsi (born 1987), motorcycle road racer

See also
 Antonio Pini-Corsi (1859–1918), Italian baritone singer

Italian-language surnames